Grantley Thomas Smart Goulding (born 23 March 1874 in Hartpury, Gloucestershire, England; died 29 July 1947 in Umkomaas, KwaZulu-Natal, Union of South Africa) was a British athlete.  He competed at the 1896 Summer Olympics in Athens.

Biography
Goulding was born in Hartpury, Gloucestershire to a rich farming family. He later emigrated to South Africa and settled on the Natal coast. Goulding first gained prominence as a local athlete in the Gloucestershire area when he won a number of races in the 1895 season. In a meeting at Gloucester he defeated the visiting South African champion but was less successful at the AAA championships where he finished last in his heat.

Goulding competed in the 110 metres hurdles in Athens.  He finished in first place in his preliminary heat with a time of 18.4 seconds, advancing to the final.  In the final he faced only Thomas Curtis of the United States after two other finalists had withdrawn. A stumble from Goulding at the start of the race appears to have been decisive; although he gained ground on Curtis after halfway, he could not close the gap.  At the end of the race, the officials declared that Curtis had won by a margin of a mere 5 centimetres.  Both finished in 17.6 seconds. In 1932, Curtis wrote in The Sportsman that Goulding "stopped neither to linger or say farewell, but went straight from the stadium to the station and took the first train out of Athens".

In the 1984 NBC miniseries, The First Olympics: Athens 1896, he was portrayed as being very pompous and having a habit of taking his opponents (especially the Americans) very lightly.  He exhibited such poor sportsmanship that British officials (and Pierre de Coubertin) came to resent him.  When he finished the 110 Metre Hurdles final, he was booed raucously by the crowd and pelted with fruit. He died in Umkomaas, Natal, South Africa in 1947.

References

Further reading
 (Digitally available at )

External links

1874 births
1947 deaths
People from Hartpury
English male hurdlers
Olympic athletes of Great Britain
Athletes (track and field) at the 1896 Summer Olympics
19th-century sportsmen
Sportspeople from Gloucestershire
Olympic silver medallists for Great Britain
Medalists at the 1896 Summer Olympics
Olympic silver medalists in athletics (track and field)
British Army personnel of the Second Boer War
Imperial Light Horse officers
British emigrants to the Colony of Natal